|}

The Aphrodite Stakes is a Listed flat horse race in Great Britain open to mares and fillies aged three years or older.
It is run at Newmarket over a distance of 1 mile and 4 furlongs (2,414 metres), and it is scheduled to take place each year in July.

The race was first run in 1994.

Records

Leading jockey (3 wins):
Richard Hills  – Suhaad (1999), Ranin (2001), Eastern Aria (2010)

Leading trainer (5 wins):
John Gosden – Shemozzle (1996), Anno Luce (1997), Marani (2002), Treble Heights (2003), Quenched (2006)

Winners

See also
 Horse racing in Great Britain
 List of British flat horse races

References
Racing Post:

Flat races in Great Britain
Newmarket Racecourse
Long-distance horse races for fillies and mares
Recurring sporting events established in 1994
1994 establishments in England